The 2021–22 DFB-Pokal was the 42nd season of the annual German football cup competition. Several teams participated in the competition, including all teams from the previous year's Frauen-Bundesliga and the 2. Frauen-Bundesliga, excluding second teams. The competition began on 21 August 2021 with the first of six rounds and ended on 28 May 2022 with the final at the RheinEnergieStadion in Cologne, a nominally neutral venue, which has hosted the final since 2010.

VfL Wolfsburg were the seven-time defending champion and defended their title by defeating Turbine Potsdam in the final.

Participating clubs
The following clubs qualified for the competition:

Format
Clubs from lower leagues hosted against clubs from higher leagues until the quarter-finals. Should both clubs play below the 2. Bundesliga, there were no host club change anymore.

Schedule
The rounds of the 2021–22 competition were scheduled as follows:

First round
The draw was made on 13 July 2021, with Doris Fitschen drawing the matches. The teams were split in a North and South group. The matches took place on 21 and 22 August 2021. The ten best-placed clubs from the 2020–21 Frauen-Bundesliga received a bye.

Second round
The draw was made on 30 August 2021, with Friederike Kromp drawing the matches. The matches took place from 25 to 27 September 2021.

Round of 16
The draw was made on 3 October 2021, with Julia Simic drawing the matches. The matches took place from 30 to 1 November 2021.

Quarter-finals
The draw was made on 7 November 2021, with Verena Schweers drawing the matches. The four matches took place from 28 February to 2 March 2022.

Semi-finals
The draw for the semi-finals was held on 6 March 2022, with Laura Nolte drawing the matches. The two matches took place from 17 to 18 April 2022.

Final
The final took place on 28 May 2022 at the RheinEnergieStadion in Cologne.

Top goalscorers
The following players were the top scorers of the DFB-Pokal, sorted first by number of goals, and then alphabetically if necessary. Goals scored in penalty shoot-outs are not included.

Notes

References

Women
2021–22